Springfield Town Center is an enclosed shopping center located in the Springfield census-designated place (CDP) of unincorporated Fairfax County, Virginia. It opened in 1973 as Springfield Mall, an enclosed shopping mall, which closed on June 30, 2012 as part of a multimillion-dollar redevelopment plan to turn it into a multifaceted "Town Center"-style shopping center with a main indoor area similar to the nearby Tysons Corner Center and Dulles Town Center, while transforming the exterior into a pedestrian friendly environment with restaurants with cafe style outdoor seating and entrances. It is located at the intersection of Interstate 95 and Franconia Road (Route 644), which is part of the Springfield Interchange, 1/4 mile north of Franconia-Springfield Parkway (State Route 289) and the Franconia-Springfield Metro station. The mall reopened on October 17, 2014 following its two-year renovation.

Original anchors were Lansburgh's (later E.J. Korvette), Garfinckel's (later Sports Authority), J.C. Penney, and Montgomery Ward (later Target). Macy's was added in 1991. The mall was notable for having one of the top two performing locations of the Time Out chain of amusement arcades, which featured in its mall rat culture during the 1980s golden age of arcades.

Prince Charles and Princess Diana visited the JCPenney store at the mall on November 11, 1985, during their famous American tour.  However, the mall's fortunes declined in the 1990s and 2000s. Its DMV office was where Hani Hanjour and Khalid al-Mihdhar, two of the hijackers in the September 11 attacks, illegally obtained state identification. The mall also experienced two gang-related stabbings in 2005, two fatal shootings, one in December 2007 and one in June 2022 
 and a fatal carjacking in September 2008.

One of the largest malls in Northern Virginia, it was owned and operated by Vornado Realty Trust. In 2005, Vornado purchased an option valued at $36 million to buy the mall from the previous owners Franconia Two LP. In early 2006, Vornado purchased the mall for an additional $80 million along with plans to redevelop.

In March 2012, Vornado announced plans to close all but the three anchor stores starting on July 1, ahead of the two-year renovation and redevelopment, which is part of a decade-long plan intended to turn the Mall and its surrounding area into the new Springfield Town Center. Springfield Town Center re-opened on October 17, 2014.

In March 2014, Vornado announced plans to sell Springfield Town Center to Pennsylvania Real Estate Investment Trust (PREIT) for $465 million, with the deal slated to close in March 2015. In late 2015, Dave and Buster's, a popular family owned entertainment and sports bar opened.

In February 2022, PREIT announced that the property would open a LEGO Discovery Center in 2023. The 32,000 square foot indoor attraction will be co-created by Merlin & the LEGO Group and will be located at the main entrance to the property.

References

External links 
 

1973 establishments in Virginia
2012 disestablishments in Virginia
2014 establishments in Virginia
Buildings and structures in Fairfax County, Virginia
Economy of Fairfax County, Virginia
Pennsylvania Real Estate Investment Trust
Shopping malls established in 1973
Shopping malls established in 2014
Shopping malls in the Washington metropolitan area
Shopping malls in Virginia
Springfield, Virginia